The 2009–10 season was Falkirk's fifth consecutive season in the Scottish Premier League. Falkirk also competed in the League Cup, Scottish Cup and the Europa League. Falkirk finished the season in twelfth place and were relegated to the Scottish First Division after five years in the SPL.

Summary
Falkirk finished as runners-up in the 2009 Scottish Cup Final and qualified for the UEFA Europa League. They entered the second qualifying round of the competition, losing 2–1 on aggregate, after extra-time, to Vaduz, becoming the first British club to lose a European tie to a club from Liechtenstein. Falkirk were relegated to the Scottish First Division for the first time since 2005 after a 0–0 draw with Kilmarnock on the final day of the season. Kilmarnock were also at threat of being relegated and the winner of the match at Rugby Park would have remained in the SPL. Falkirk also reached the third round of the League Cup, the fourth round of the Scottish Cup.

Management
Falkirk began the season under the management of Eddie May who had been appointed in June 2009 after several years of coaching in the youth set-up at the club. On 11 February 2010, May stepped down from his position, with the club sitting bottom of the SPL. He was succeeded by Steven Pressley, player-coach at the club and was appointed until the end of the season.

Results

Scottish Premier League

UEFA Europa League

Scottish League Cup

Scottish Cup

Squad statistics

Player statistics

|-
|colspan="12"|Players who left the club during the 2009–10 season
|-

|}

Team statistics

League table

Transfers

Players in

Players out

References

Falkirk
Falkirk F.C. seasons